The Sir Syed CASE Institute of Technology is a private university located in Islamabad, Pakistan.

History 
In May 2001, a group of engineers returned after completing Ph.D in the United States. They set up EET (Engineering education trust) as a not-for-profit public charitable organization for education purposes. Their aim was to provide substantial contributions to the research and publications areas in Pakistan through the introduction of graduate degree programs.

The institute was started on September 12, 2001, at the Software Technology Park, Islamabad, in affiliation with the University of Engineering and Technology, Taxila. The affiliation permitted it to start M.Sc. and Ph.D. degree programs in computer engineering. It was inaugurated by the then Minister of Science and Technology professor Dr. Atta-ur-Rahman. Dr. Kamal Athar was the director from 2001 until 2003. It started with a faculty of nine Ph.Ds and three Master of Science.

The institute started a B.Sc. program in 2003 in its school SS-CARE (Sir Syed Center for Advanced Research in Engineering) initially in collaboration with Sir Syed Memorial Society, named after Indian reformer Syed Ahmad Khan. The classes started at Sir Syed Esquire situated at 19th Atatürk Avenue, Islamabad. Later on, undergraduate classes commenced under the name of CASE (Center for Advanced Studies in Engineering). In 2018, it has obtained a degree awarding status by the Government of Pakistan. It is the first institute which started engineering management degree program in Pakistan.

Degree programs
Undergraduate programs

 Bachelor of Science in Computer Science
 Bachelor of Science in Electrical Engineering
 Bachelor of Science in Software Engineering
 Bachelor of Science in Accounting and Finance
 Bachelor of Business Administration
 Associate Degree In commerce(Bcom) 
Graduate programs 	

 Master of Science in Computer Engineering
 Master of Science in Electrical Engineering
 Master of Science in Software Engineering
 Master of Science in Engineering Management
 Master of Science in Management
 Master of Science in Project Management
 Master of Business Administration
 Doctor of Philosophy in Computer Engineering
 Doctor of Philosophy in Engineering Management
 Doctor of Philosophy in Management

See also
 List of universities in Pakistan
 List of engineering universities and colleges in Pakistan

References

External links
SSCIT official website

Educational institutions established in 2001
2001 establishments in Pakistan
Engineering universities and colleges in Pakistan
Universities and colleges in Islamabad
Private universities and colleges in Pakistan